The New Zealand raspberry bud moth (Heterocrossa rubophaga) is a moth of the Carposinidae family. It is endemic to New Zealand.

The wingspan is 14–17 mm. Adults are very variable, some individuals being very light in colour, others very dark, darkish-brown, or dark grey. One variety has a pair of dark converging lines. The forewings have two conspicuous raised tufts of scales, one lying anteriorly, and a larger one posteriorly with a small tuft between the two. The hindwings are cream-coloured with long hairs posteriorly. The male can usually be distinguished from the female by the long hairs on the end of the abdomen.

The egg is yellowish-green in colour, but changes during development to a yellowish-gold, the area under the spines becoming orange, which, as development continues, spreads till more than hall the egg is coloured.

The larvae are destructive to the buds and fruit of raspberry and blackberry. The first instar larva is about 1 mm long. The head and dorsal portion of the prothorax are dark in colour, the rest of the body is whitish cream. The final instar larva is about 10 mm in length. The under surface is yellowish-green, depending on the amount of food in the alimentary tract.

References

External links
Holotype specimen of Heterocrossa rubophaga.

Carposinidae
Moths of New Zealand
Moths described in 1988
Endemic fauna of New Zealand
Endemic moths of New Zealand